Beghal v DPP was a 2015 judgment of the Supreme Court of the United Kingdom concerning powers of the police in England and Wales.

Facts
Sylvie Beghal is the wife of Djamel Beghal. In January 2011 she was returning from visiting her husband in Paris when the police stopped her as she was passing through East Midlands Airport. They questioned her under Schedule 7, Paragraph 2 of the Terrorism Act 2000 whereby no reasonable suspicion of past or future offences is required, documents can be copied and retained and individuals can be detained for a maximum of six hours.

Beghal refused to answer most of the questions and was charged with willfully failing to comply with the requirement to answer questions under Schedule 7, Paragraph 18 of the Terrorism Act 2000 (Schedule 7).

Although Beghal pleaded guilty to this offence and received a conditional discharge she brought proceedings arguing that the police powers under Schedule 7 breached her rights under Articles 5 (right to liberty), 6 (right to a fair trial) and 8 (right to privacy) of the European Convention on Human Rights (Convention).

Judgment

Magistrates' Court
Beghal pleaded guilty to the offence under Schedule 7, Paragraph 18(1)(a) before District Judge Temperley at Leicester Magistrates' Court on 12 December 2011. She appealed to the High Court by way of Case Stated.

High Court
Beghal's appeal under articles 5, 6 and 8 were all dismissed. However Lord Justice Gross did conclude that:

Supreme Court
The Supreme Court dismissed Beghal's appeal by a majority of 4-1. Lord Hughes delivered the leading judgment and dealt with the three Convention articles in turn.

Article 5 (Right to Liberty)
It was held that although the power to detain a person for six hours falls within the scope of Article 5(1)(b) of the Convention this "was for no longer than was necessary for the completion of the process. There was no requirement to attend a police station. Accordingly, there was in this case no breach of article 5."

Article 6 (Right to a fair trial)
Article 6 was found to have no application in this case because answers given under a Schedule 7 interview would be inadmissible as per section 78 of the Police and Criminal Evidence Act.

Article 8 (Right to Privacy)
While it was held that there was an interference with Beghal's right to privacy this was found to be justified in accordance with Article 8(2). Lord Hughes concluded:

Lord Kerr's dissent
Lord Kerr would have found the Schedule 7 provisions to be incompatible with Articles 5, 6 and 8 for the following reasons:
 The powers are not 'in accordance with the law' given the potential for their arbitrary use.
 The powers go beyond what is necessary to accomplish the aim of combatting terrorism.
There is not a proper balance between the rights of the individual and the interests of the wider community.

Reaction and Aftermath
Lawyers for Mrs Beghal indicated that although she was disappointed with the ruling she welcomed Lord Kerr's "blistering" dissent and indicated that they would pursue the case at the European Court of Human Rights.

On 28 February 2019, the European Court of Human Rights disagreed with much of the Supreme Court's majority analysis and unanimously found that a violation of Article 8 (right to respect for private and family life) had occurred. The Court "considered that there was no need to examine the applicant's complaint under Article 5 as it was based on the same facts as her Article 8 complaint." The Court's central complaint was that there were "insufficient safeguards" to Schedule 7 such that, "considered together with the absence of any requirement of “reasonable suspicion”, the Court found that at the time the applicant had been stopped the Schedule 7 powers had not been “in accordance with the law”.

As of March 2019, the UK remains in breach of the Convention and has yet to amend the offending legislation.

See also
European Convention on Human Rights
Anti-terrorism legislation
Djamel Beghal
Human rights in the United Kingdom

References

External links
Supreme Court judgment
Video of the judgment

Supreme Court of the United Kingdom cases
2015 in British law
2015 in case law
Human rights in the United Kingdom
East Midlands Airport